The Ministry of Defence, formerly called the Ministry of War and Ministry of National Defence, is the Belgian ministry responsible for national defence and the Belgian military. Belgium's ministry of defence is responsible to the Minister of Defence.

As a result of the Verhofstadt I Government's plans to modernise the federal administration, all other ministries were transformed into Federal Public Services (FPS), but in August 2007 there still was no Royal Order creating the FPS Defence, although that name is already in use on official websites. The Ministry of Defence is responsible to the Minister of Defence.

The Chief of Defence (CHOD) is the highest uniformed official in the Ministry of Defence. The CHOD is assisted in the exercise of his functions by a Vice-Chief of Defence (VCHOD) and a Secretary-General.

The Ministry of Defence is organised into multiple staff departments and directorates-general. The Armed Forces are subordinate to the Assistant Chief of Staff (ACOS) Operations and Training, who heads the Staff Department for Operations and Training. He is assisted by two Deputy Assistant Chiefs of Staff (DACOS), one for Operations and Planning and one for Training and Support.

Another staff department is the Staff Department for Intelligence and Security, which is led by the ACOS Intelligence and Security. This staff department is also known as the General Intelligence and Security Service and is responsible for military intelligence and security.

Ministers of Defence

2000s

* Incumbent's term duration last updated: .

See also
 Military of Belgium
 Defence Diplomacy

References

External links

Belgium
Defence
Military of Belgium
Ministries established in 1831
1831 establishments in Belgium
Belgium
Belgium